Robert Ross, Fellow of the Linnean Society (14 August 1912 in Pinner – 25 May 2005) was an English botanist.  He was Keeper of Botany at the British Natural History Museum.

References 

 Times Obituary 
 ROSS, Robert’, Who Was Who, A & C Black, 1920–2008; online edn, Oxford University Press, Dec 2007 accessed 19 May 2011

1912 births
2005 deaths
Fellows of the Linnean Society of London
English botanists
People associated with the Natural History Museum, London
People from Pinner
Alumni of St John's College, Cambridge
People educated at St Paul's School, London